An Englishman Looks at the World is a 1914 essay collection by H. G. Wells containing journalistic pieces written between 1909 and 1914.  The book consists of twenty-six pieces ranging from five to sixty-two pages in length.  An American edition was published the same year by Harper and Brothers under the title Social Forces in England and America.

Wells organized the essays thematically, inserting a fanciful "synopsis" after the table of contents conveying his view that the book constituted an argument:  "Blériot arrives and sets him thinking. (1) He flies, (2) and deduces certain consequences of cheap travel. (3) He considers the King, and speculates on the New Epoch; (4) he thinks Imperially, (5) and then, coming to details, about Labour, (6) Socialism, (7) and Modern Warfare. (8) He discourses on the Modern Novel, (9) and the Public Library; (10) criticises Chesterton, Belloc, (11) and Sir Thomas More, (12) and deals with the London Traffic Problem as a Socialist should. (13) He doubts the existence of Sociology, (14) discusses Divorce, (15) Schoolmasters, (16) Motherhood, (17) Doctors, (18) and Specialisation; (19) questions if there is a People, (20) and diagnoses the Political Disease of Our Times. (21) He then speculates upon the future of the American Population, (22) considers a possible set-back to civilisation, (23) the Ideal Citizen, (24) the still undeveloped possibilities of Science, (25), and—in the broadest spirit—the Human Adventure. (26)"

Background
The journalistic production in An Englishman Looks at the World reflects Wells's turn from novel-writing to journalism, which began in the years before the outbreak of the Great War. He was more and more frequently invited to write articles for popular periodicals like the Daily Mail.

References

External links
 

1914 non-fiction books
Books about England
Books about the United States
Books by H. G. Wells
Cassell (publisher) books
English essay collections